A Mad Idea or A Crazy Idea is a 1932 German comedy film directed by Kurt Gerron and starring Willy Fritsch, Dorothea Wieck and Rosy Barsony. It was made by UFA, Germany's biggest studio. It was shot at the Babelsberg Studios in Berlin. The film's art direction was by Julius von Borsody. Location shooting took place around St. Moritz in Switzerland.

Cast
 Willy Fritsch as Paul Lüders
 Dorothea Wieck as Mabel Miller
 Rosy Barsony as Anita
 Max Adalbert as Birnstiel
 Jakob Tiedtke as Michael Lüders
 Harry Halm as Bob
 Heinz Salfner as Herr Miller
 Leo Slezak as Theo Müller, Manager der Miller Girls
 Ellen Schwanneke as Evelyn Müller
 Wilhelm Bendow as Wendolin
 Fritz Odemar as Werner Schubart
 Genia Nikolaieva as Marga Schubart
 Gerda Bunnemann
 Aenne Goerling as Minna
 Paul Hörbiger as Emil
 Ferdinand Hart
 Theo Lingen as Oberkellner
 Adele Sandrock as Mieterin
 Oskar Sima as Steuer-Inspektor
 Leopoldine Konstantin
 Klaus Pohl as Schneider
 Gustav Waldau

References

Bibliography

External links 
 

1932 films
Films of the Weimar Republic
German comedy films
1932 comedy films
1930s German-language films
Films directed by Kurt Gerron
Films scored by Bronisław Kaper
German multilingual films
UFA GmbH films
German black-and-white films
1932 multilingual films
1930s German films
Films shot at Babelsberg Studios